The 1937 Detroit Titans football team represented the University of Detroit as an independent during the 1937 college football season. In their 13th year under head coach Gus Dorais, the Titans compiled a 7–3 record, shut out five opponents, was ranked No. 18 in the AP Poll after winning its first five games, and outscored all opponents by a combined total of 253 to 42. The Titans defeated Border Conference champion Texas Tech (34–0) and held the undefeated 1937 Villanova Wildcats football team to seven points.

In addition to head coach Gus Dorais, the team's coaching staff included Lloyd Brazil (backfield coach), Bud Boeringer (line coach), Eddie Barbour (freshman coach), William Pegan (assistant freshman coach), and Robert Burns (assistant freshman coach). Joe Cieslak was the team captain.

Schedule

References

External links
 1937 University of Detroit football programs

Detroit
Detroit Titans football seasons
Detroit Titans football
Detroit Titans football